Chikamin Lake is a small alpine freshwater lake located on the northern skirt of Chikamin Peak and Lemah Mountain in King County, Washington. Because of its proximity to surrounding peaks and mountains at the heart of the Alpine Lakes Wilderness, the lake is a popular area for hiking. Other Alpine lakes are in the vicinity, including the Icebox Lake, Glacier Lake and Spectacle Lake a short distance South, at the base of Chikamin Ridge. To the North is Avalanche Lake and Iceberg Lake.

Location
Chikamin Lake is located northeast of Snoqualmie Pass and The Summit at Snoqualmie. The trailhead is at Gold Creek Pond on the North shore of Keechelus Lake and South of Snoqualmie Pass on Interstate 90. It is situated within the Alpine Lakes Wilderness, on land managed by the Okanogan–Wenatchee National Forest.

Climate
Chikamin Lake is located in a hemiboreal climate, part of the marine west coast climate zone of western North America.

See also 
 List of lakes of the Alpine Lakes Wilderness

References

Lakes of Washington (state)
Lakes of Kittitas County, Washington